Trubridge is a surname. Notable people with the surname include:

 David Trubridge, New Zealand furniture designer
 Horace Trubridge (born 1957), British trade union leader and former musician
 William Trubridge (born 1980), New Zealand freediver

See also
 Troubridge (disambiguation)